Woodhaven Junction was a station complex on the Atlantic Branch and Rockaway Beach Branch of the Long Island Rail Road, located at Atlantic Avenue between 98th and 100th Streets in Woodhaven, Queens, New York City. The elevated Rockaway Beach station was closed in 1962 along with the rest of the branch, while the underground Atlantic Branch station was closed and abandoned on January 7, 1977.

History

Early history

The station was first opened by the LIRR in the 1880s for the Rockaway Beach Branch (then known as the New York, Woodhaven and Rockaway Railroad), and in 1893 for the Atlantic Branch.

Renovation
Beginning in May 1940, both stations were rebuilt when the Atlantic Branch was grade separated and placed in a tunnel. The elevated Rockaway Beach station opened in September 1941, while the underground Atlantic Branch station opened for service on December 28, 1942.

Decline and closing
In the early expansion plans of the city's Independent Subway System in the 1930s, the Rockaway Beach Branch was planned to be absorbed into the new subway, which would have turned the Woodhaven elevated station into a stop on the IND Queens Boulevard Line or a new Queens crosstown line. In 1950, the Rockaway Beach Branch south of the Howard Beach station had closed after the trestle on Jamaica Bay between The Raunt and Broad Channel Stations was destroyed by a fire. The city purchased the entire line in 1955, but only the portion south of Liberty Avenue was reactivated for subway service.

Ridership declined on the remaining portion of the LIRR Rockaway Beach Branch, and fewer trains were scheduled to stop at Woodhaven on the Atlantic Branch. Passengers who would normally use the station had to ride buses to the next nearest stations. The elevated station of the Rockaway Beach Branch closed first on June 8, 1962, along with the rest of the Rockaway Beach Branch.

The underground station of the Atlantic Branch closed on January 7, 1977 due to vandalism and declining ridership. At the time, only two trains, one in each direction, stopped at Woodhaven. Most lights at the station had been broken by thrown beer bottles and rocks, and the walls were covered with graffiti and were filthy. LIRR President Robert Pattison said the station was a popular hangout spot for neighborhood vandals.

Station layout

The elevated station, located on a trestle adjacent to 100th Street, was built with two concrete high-level side platforms, with staircases down to the street and the Atlantic Branch on either side of Atlantic Avenue. The underground station's design resembled an Independent Subway station, with tile work of the same design; the name mosaic reads "Woodhaven." South of the elevated station was a two-track wye, curving northwest from the Rockaway branch to merge with the Atlantic branch west of its station at about 96th Street.

Woodhaven Junction is one of two stations on the abandoned Rockaway Beach Branch still standing (the other being Ozone Park), while the underground Atlantic Branch station is still visible from passing trains. The now-abandoned LIRR substation is present on the south side of Atlantic Avenue west of the elevated line. The northern staircases to the elevated station are still visible. The former track junction and part of the Rockaway Branch right-of-way south to 97th Avenue has been paved over and is used as a school bus depot for the Logan Bus Company; the ramp and tunnel portal of the wye have been filled in.

References

External links

Abandoned Stations - Woodhaven (Joseph Brennan)
Former Rockaway Beach Branch, including Woodhaven Station (Forgotten New York)
The Former Woodhaven Station (The LIRR Today)
Site of the former Woodhaven Junction LIRR station (Road and Rail Pictures)

Former Long Island Rail Road stations in New York City
Railway stations in Queens, New York
Railway stations in the United States opened in 1886
Railway stations closed in 1977
1886 establishments in New York (state)
1976 disestablishments in New York (state)
Railway stations located underground in New York (state)
Woodhaven, Queens